Prairie Grove School may refer to:

Prairie Grove School (Des Moines County, Iowa), listed on the National Register of Historic Places
Prairie Grove School (Nemaha County, Kansas), listed on the National Register of Historic Places